Sigrid Gurie (born Sigrid Guri Haukelid; May 18, 1911 – August 14, 1969) was an American actress from the late 1930s to early 1940s.

Early life 
Gurie was born in Brooklyn, New York. Her father was a civil engineer who worked for the New York City Subway from 1902 to 1912. As she and her twin brother, Knut, were born in the United States, the twins held dual Norwegian-American citizenship. In 1914, the family returned to Norway. Sigrid  subsequently grew up in Oslo and was educated in Norway, Sweden, and Belgium.

In 1935, Gurie married Thomas Stewart of California; she filed for divorce in 1938. Her brother became a noted member of the Norwegian resistance movement during World War II. 
Knut Haukelid died at age 82 in 1994.

Career 

In 1936, Gurie arrived in Hollywood. Film magnate Sam Goldwyn reportedly took credit for discovering her, promoting his discovery as "the Norwegian Garbo" and billed her as "the siren of the fjords". She starred as Kokashin, daughter of Kublai Khan, in the 1938 production of The Adventures of Marco Polo, When the press discovered Gurie's birth in Flatbush, Goldwyn then claimed "the greatest hoax in movie history." She was then scapegoated for the film's failure.

She went on to give worthwhile performances in such films as Algiers (1938), Three Faces West (1940) and Voice in the Wind (1944). She had a minor role in the classic Norwegian film Kampen om tungtvannet (1948). The movie was based principally on the book Skis Against the Atom which was written by her brother, Knut Haukelid, a noted saboteur and member of the Norwegian resistance against German occupation in World War II.

Later years and death

In the late 1940s she attended the Kann Art Institute, operated in West Hollywood by abstract artist Frederick I. Kann (1886–1965). She studied oils and portraiture. Among her works were landscapes, portraits and pen and ink sketches.

From 1961 to 1969 she lived in San Miguel de Allende, Mexico, where she continued painting, and was also designing jewelry for Royal Copenhagen in Denmark.

She entered the hospital in Mexico City on an emergency basis for a recurring kidney problem, then developed a blood clot that passed through her lungs, which led to her death.

Filmography

References

External links

 
 
 
 

1911 births
1969 deaths
People from Brooklyn
American people of Norwegian descent
20th-century American actresses
Norwegian twins
American expatriates in Mexico